Kenneth Tippins, (born July 22, 1966 in Adel, Georgia) is a former American football linebacker in the National Football League for the Dallas Cowboys and Atlanta Falcons. He played college football at Middle Tennessee State University.

Early years
Tippins attended Cook High School, where he practiced football and basketball. He received All-county honors as a senior.

He accepted a football scholarship to play at Middle Tennessee State University, where he was a three-year starter at defensive end and a two-time All-OVC selection. In 1987 against Eastern Kentucky University, he posted 11 tackles, one sack, one interception and recovered 2 fumbles. As a senior, he deflected a team-high 7 passes. He finished his career with 151 tackles (20 for loss) and 9 sacks.

In 1990 after playing his first NFL season, he returned to school to work on his Physical Education degree at a time when the basketball team was left with only 3 active players, after suspensions were handed down following a bench-clearing brawl against Tennessee Tech University. Because he was still technically eligible to play basketball, he ended up being a part of the team for 4 games and had a chance to play against future NBA player Popeye Jones. He also finished with a 100 field goal percentage after making his only shot.

Professional career

Dallas Cowboys
Tippins signed as an undrafted free agent with the Dallas Cowboys in 1989, with the intention of being converted into an outside linebacker. He initially joined the practice squad, before being promoted to the active roster for the eleventh game of the season against the Miami Dolphins.

Atlanta Falcons
He signed as a free agent with the Atlanta Falcons on May 9, 1990, starting 2 games. He was named a regular starter midway through the next season and in 1992. He returned to a backup role in the following years. In 1994, he started 7 games.

Personal life
In March 2009, he was sentenced to ten years in prison with four to serve after pleading guilty to cocaine-related offences. In 2010, he was released after serving one year in prison.

In April 2019, he was sentenced for drug trafficking charges to twelve years and seven months in prison followed by three years supervised release. This was his third drug conviction.

References

1966 births
Living people
Players of American football from Georgia (U.S. state)
People from Cook County, Georgia
American football linebackers
Middle Tennessee Blue Raiders football players
Middle Tennessee Blue Raiders men's basketball players
Dallas Cowboys players
Atlanta Falcons players
American men's basketball players